This is a list of charters promulgated by Monarchs of England that specifically relate to the islands of Jersey, Guernsey, Alderney or Sark which together form the Channel Islands, also known as the Bailiwick of Jersey and the Bailiwick of Guernsey.

Forming part of Brittany and then Normandy in the 10th and 11th centuries, the Duke of Normandy, in 1066, took the Crown of England.

The physical location of the Channel Islands became important when the English Monarchs began to lose their French possessions and the islands became the front line in a series of wars with France that lasted for centuries. Loyalty to the English Crown was rewarded.

The Charters are given in the form of Letters patent being a form of open or public proclamation and generally conclude with: In cujus rei testimonium has literas nostras fieri fecimus patentes.  (in witness whereof we have caused these our letters to be made patent.) The Charters being confirmed by the Council in Parliament, or by the Parliament of England.

List
The legal materials are as follows:

 GG – Charter held in Guernsey Greffe

See also
 Law of Guernsey
 Law of Jersey

Further reading
 Thornton, Tim. The Charters of Guernsey (Woodfield Publishing, 2004)

References 

Guernsey law
History of Guernsey
History of Jersey
Jersey law
Legal documents

External links 
 Side by side translations of the charters from Latin or Anglo-Norman French into English